A biobank is a physical place which stores biological specimens.  In some cases, participant data is also collected and stored. Access policies details may vary across biobanks but generally involve obtaining ethics approval from institutional review boards (IRB) and scientific review or peer review approval from the institutions under which the biobanks operate as well as Ethics approval from the institutions where the research projects will be undertaken.  The samples and data are safeguarded so that researchers can use them in experiments deemed adequate.  This article contains a list of biobanks.

Classification
Biobanks can be classified in several ways.  Some examples of how they can be classified is by their controlling entity (government, commercial enterprise, or private research institution), by their geographical location, or by what sorts of samples they collect.

Biobanks may be classified by purpose or design. Disease-oriented biobanks usually have a hospital affiliation through which they collect samples representing a variety of diseases, perhaps to look for biomarkers affiliated with disease. Population-based biobanks need no particular hospital affiliation because they sample from large numbers of all kinds of people, perhaps to look for biomarkers for disease susceptibility in a general population.

References

External links
List of biobanks

Biobank organizations

biobanks, List of